Forficula aetolica is a species of earwig in the family Forficulidae. They can be found in the Palearctic realm, especially Turkey, Greece, Cyprus, and Ukraine.

References 

Forficulidae
Arthropods of Turkey
Fauna of Greece
Insects described in 1882